Council Regulation (EC) No 6/2002 of 12 December 2001 on Community designs is a European Union regulation 
which introduces a unified system of industrial design rights, called Community designs, throughout the 
European Union. The system which includes both unregistered and registered design rights, 
operates in addition to national systems of protection in each Member State, which are partially harmonised by the 
Directive on the legal protection of designs (98/71/EC).

Eligible designs 
A design is defined as "the appearance of the whole or a part of a product resulting from the features of, in particular, 
the lines, contours, colours, shape, texture and/or materials of the product itself and/or its ornamentation" (Art. 3). 
Designs may be protected if:
they are novel, that is if no identical design has been made available to the public;
they have individual character, that is the "informed user" would find it different from other designs which are available to the public.
Where a design forms part of a more complex product, the novelty and individual character of the design are judged on the part 
of the design which is visible during normal use.

Designs are not protected insofar as their appearance is wholly determined by their technical function, or by the need to 
interconnect with other products to perform a technical function (the "must-fit" exception). However modular systems such as 
Lego or Mechano may be protected [Art. 8(3)].

Unregistered Community designs 
All designs which are eligible are protected as unregistered Community designs for a period of three years from the date on 
which the design was first made available to the public in the European Union. "The public" in this case is defined as "the 
circles specialised in the sector concerned".

Registration of designs 
Eligible designs may be registered within one year of their first being made available to the public: it is also possible to 
claim "priority" if an application for a registered design right has been made in a country party to the 
Paris Convention for the Protection of Industrial Property (Paris Convention) or the 
Agreement on Trade-Related Aspects of Intellectual Property Rights (TRIPS) in the six months prior to the application for
registration of the Community design. Applications may be made in national intellectual property offices, in the 
Benelux design office or directly at the European Union Intellectual Property Office (EUIPO) in 
Alicante, Spain. The detailed rules for applications and procedures for registration are contained in 
Commission Regulation (EC) No 2245/2002, while the fees are specified in Commission Regulation (EC) No 2246/2002.

Publication and language 
Applications may be filed in any official language of the European Union.

See also 
Industrial design rights in the European Union
Community trade mark

References 

Community designs
2001 in law
2001 in the European Union

de:Verordnung (EG) Nr. 6/2002 über das Gemeinschaftsgeschmacksmuster